Adler is an unincorporated community in Perry County, Alabama, United States. A post office operated under the name Adler from 1887 to 1905. Adler lies entirely within the Oakmulgee District of the Talladega National Forest.

Demographics
According to the returns from 1850-2010 for Alabama, it has never reported a population figure separately on the U.S. Census.

References

Unincorporated communities in Perry County, Alabama
Unincorporated communities in Alabama